The Saint Petersburg Griffins are a professional American football team based in Saint Petersburg, Russia.

The Griffins compete in the League of American Football (LAF) as a member club of the league's Center division. The Griffins have won one LAF Championships, including one Russian Bowl.

Season by season

LAF

Source: Enciclopedia del Football - A cura di Roberto Mezzetti

Achievements
Russian Championship / League of American Football
 Champions (1): 2015
 Final (2): 2013, 2017
Russian Cup
 Champions (2): 2020

References

External links
 

American football teams in Russia
American football teams established in 2005
Sports clubs in Saint Petersburg
2005 establishments in Russia